Tyler Rees (born 6 February 1999 in Llanelli, Carmarthenshire) is a Welsh amateur snooker player. He was Under-18 European Snooker Champion in 2016.

Career
In February 2016, Rees entered the 2016 EBSA European Under-18 Snooker Championship as the number 15 seed, he managed to advance to the final where he defeated fellow countryman Jackson Page 5–2 in the final to win the inaugural championship. As a result, Rees was awarded a place in the qualifying rounds for the 2016 World Snooker Championship. He lost 10–0 there to Jimmy Robertson. The following season Rees was awarded a wildcard entry in the 2017 Welsh Open. However he was defeated in the first round 4-1 by Jamie Jones. Rees was again awarded with a place in the qualifying rounds for the World Championship, where once again he was defeated at the first hurdle, losing 10–2 to China's Xiao Guodong.

Performance and rankings timeline

Career finals

Amateur finals: 3 (1 title)

References

External links
Tyler Rees at CueTracker.net: Snooker Results and Statistic Database

Welsh snooker players
Living people
1999 births
Snooker players from Llanelli